Chariesthes multinotata is a species of beetle in the family Cerambycidae. It was described by Chevrolat in 1858. It has a wide distribution in Africa.

References

Chariesthes
Beetles described in 1858